Psiloscelis is a genus of clown beetles in the family Histeridae. There are about 8 described species in Psiloscelis.

Species
 Psiloscelis abnormalis Mann, 1924
 Psiloscelis albertensis Bousquet and Laplante, 2006
 Psiloscelis corrosa Casey, 1893
 Psiloscelis millepora Casey, 1916
 Psiloscelis perpunctata (J. L. LeConte, 1880)
 Psiloscelis planipes (J. L. LeConte, 1852)
 Psiloscelis repleta (J. E. LeConte, 1845)
 Psiloscelis subopaca (J. L. LeConte, 1863)

References

Further reading

 
 
 

Histeridae